Porta Coeli (Latin, 'Heaven's Gate') may refer to:

 Porta coeli Convent, in the Czech Republic
3276 Porta Coeli, a main-belt asteroid named after the convent
 Porta Coeli (Puerto Rico), a convent
 Tennenbach Abbey, Germany, originally called Porta Coeli
 Porta Coeli, a fictional warship in C. S. Forester's 1946 novel Lord Hornblower
 Porta Cœli, a Spanish warship captured in 1704 by Rear Admiral Thomas Dilkes

See also

 Gates of Heaven (disambiguation)
 Himmelpforten Monastery (Harz), Germany
 Himmelpforten Convent (Latin: Conventus Porta Coeli) in today's Lower Saxony, Germany
 Porta Coeli Charterhouse, a functioning Carthusian monastery in Valencia, Spain
 Porta Coeli Cathedral, Mexico City